The  Bamberg witch trials of 1627–1632, which took place in the self governing Catholic Prince-Bishopric of Bamberg in the Holy Roman Empire in present-day Germany, is one of the biggest mass trials and mass executions ever seen in Europe, and one of the biggest witch trials in history.

Over an extended period around 1,000 people were executed after being accused of witchcraft in Bamberg, about 900 of whom were executed in 1626–1632. People of all ages, sexes and classes, all of whom were burned at the stake, sometimes after having been beheaded, sometimes alive. The witch trials took place during the ongoing religious Thirty Years' War between Protestants and Catholics, in an area on the religious border between Catholic and Protestant territories, and were conducted by a Catholic Prince Bishop intent on introducing the Counter-Reformation in his territory.

The Bamberg witch trials is among the largest Witch trials in the Early Modern period: it was one of the four largest witch trials in Germany alongside the Trier witch trials, the Fulda witch trials, and the contemporary Würzburg witch trials.

Background
From about 1300 to 1850, the Holy Roman Empire experienced a Little Ice Age that in some locations at various time likely resulted in crop failures. One theory first put forward in the 20th century is that this caused common poor and rural people to blame "witches" although it is not clear why the previous or later episodes of bad weather failed to bring about similar deadly trials as those that occurred near the end of the 16th century. 

Prince-Bishop of Bamberg Neytard von Thüngen (d. 1598) was the first to allow witch trials in his diocese.  However, he was mostly occupied with fighting Reformation. Under his successor, Johann Philipp von Gebsattel (d. 1609) no one was executed for witchcraft.  Only under Johann Gottfried von Aschhausen (d. 1622), did prosecutions take off. Supported by the theologian , the bishop allowed a trial to go ahead that grew out of a family quarrel.  In its course, several other people were charged with witchcraft and within one year 15 had been executed. A bigger round of prosecutions came in 1616 after a series of crop failures. Through 1622 a total of 159 trials were registered, most resulting in deaths. After the execution on 24 January 1628 of Georg Haan, the trials subsided.

Witch trials of 1626-1632

Outbreak

The Bamberg witch trials of 1626-1631 was initiated by the Reform Catholic and Counter-Reformation Catholic Prince Bishop Johann Georg Fuchs von Dornheim, 
Prince Bishop of Bamberg in 1623–1633.  The territory was close to the Catholic-Protestant religious border, and the goal of the new Prince Bishop was to create a "godly state" in accordance with the ideals of the Counter-Reformation, and to make the population obedient, devout and conformally Catholic.

The exact cause of the witch trials of 1626-1631 is not entirely clear due to incomplete documentation.  In May 1626, frost destroyed the harvest in the entire region.  Citizens started to send in petitions to the authorities demanding to know why witches and wizards had caused the frost, and the Prince Bishop issued an investigation.   A woman was arrested and confessed to have caused the frost by use of witchcraft.

Legal process

A special Witch Commission was organized with the task to handle all cases of witchcraft and used special prosecutors, such as the famed doctor Schwarzkonz of Eichstätt.  A ban was issued prohibiting all criticism of the trials by use of whipping and banishment.  The Prince-Bishop was supported in his persecutions by his assisting Bishop, the theologian , who had assisted the preceding Bishops in their witch trials.

The Witch Commission used torture without any of the restrictions regulated by the Constitutio Criminalis Carolina.   
The accused were tortured to confess maleficia (harmful magic); flying; participating in a Witches' Sabbath (in Bamberg often called "witches' dance"); sexual intercourse with Satan or with a lower ranked male or female demon; and to have desecrated a sacred object.  When the accused had confessed their own guilt, torture was applied to make them named their accomplices or other people they had seen attending the Witches' Sabbath.

Those who had been named as accomplices were arrested in turn and tortured to name new accomplices, which caused the witch trial to expand rapidly in the number of arrests and executions, especially since the Witch Commission did not discriminate as to which names to accept but arrested men and women of all ages and classes indiscriminately.  In 1627, the prisoners had reached such numbers that the Prince-Bishop constructed a special witches prison, Malefizhaus or Drudenhaus, to house them all.

Cases and accused

Typical for both the Bamberg witch trials as well as the parallel witch trials in Würzburg, members of the elite were arrested after having been named by working-class people under torture, a phenomenon which would normally not have happened in modern society had the process had been about a different crime. Würzburg and Bamberg differed in that, in Würzburg, many members of the clerical elite were arrested, and a large number of children were among the accused, while Bamberg focused on secular adult elites. Many of the accused came from the class Bamberg officials and public servants, who would not normally have been arrested after having been accused by members of the working classes.

The most famous cases during the Bamberg witch trials were those of the official Georg Haan and his wife, daughter and son, who were all executed, and that of the official Johannes Junius, whose testimony of the torture he underwent become famous, was another, as was his wife.  When the wife and daughter of Georg Haan were arrested in 1627, he left the city with his son Adam Haan and issued a complaint of the arrest of his wife and daughter to the Emperor, who ordered that the wife and daughter of Haan should be released. But when Georg and his son returned to Bamberg in 1628, his wife and daughter had already been  executed after having named George and Adam as their accomplices. Georg and Adam Haan were then arrested. The Emperor protested, but the ongoing Thirty Years' War prevented an intervention in Bamberg, and the Prince-Bishop ignored the Imperial orders. One of the people Georg Haan named (while he was being tortured) as an accomplice was Johannes Junius, who is famous because of the letter he wrote to his daughter Veronica from prison in June 1628, in which he declared his innocence but had been tortured to confess his guilt and name accomplices. In May 1629, Barthol Braun, who had participated in the witch trials as a prosecutor, was himself arrested.

The number of executions are unknown as only some were documented. Of the confirmed numbers, 15 men and women were charged with witchcraft in the year 1626; 85 are noted for the year 1627, 137 for 1628, and 167 for 1629, which was the peak year of the witch trials, followed by 54 in 1630, and lesser number in 1631, but these are only the confirmed cases and are not complete. All of the accused were executed by burning: sometimes the condemned could be decapitated beforehand, but the majority appear to have been burned alive. To conserve fire wood, a large crematorium was built at Zeil am Main, the centre of the executions.

The end

The ongoing mass process in Bamberg attracted a lot of attention.  The fact that the Witch Commission accepted the names of accomplices given by accused witches under torture indiscriminately regardless of class, had the result than many people arrested had influential relatives, family members and friends of the upper classes, with sufficient resources and knowledge to escape the territory and to issue complaints against the Prince Bishop and his witch trials to his superiors, such as the Holy Roman Emperor and the Pope.

A turning point was the case against Dorothea Flock, member of a well-off merchant family from Nuremberg, whose spouse fled to a colony of Bamberg refugees in Nuremberg and issued a complaint of her arrest to the Emperor.   In April 1630, the Emperor called upon the Prince-Bishop to defend himself against the accusation made against him and to put an immediate stop of the case against Dorothea Flock.  The Prince-Bishop defied the Emperor and resumed the case against Flock 28 April, which resulted in a new protest from the Emperor on 11 May, and the Pope was asked to intervene.  An Imperial edict was issued by the Hofrat, but the witch hunters learned about its imminent delivery and executed Dorothea shortly before its arrival.  When Dorothea Flock was executed on 17 May, the problem of the ongoing Bamberg witch trials were placed on the agenda of the Imperial Diet of Regensburg 20 September 1630.  This caused outrage among the leadership of the Catholic church in Germany, who held the bishop responsible.  An investigation by the Hofrat prevented any further trials from being launched.  In parallel, Germany was devastated by the Swedish army under king Gustavus Adolphus of Sweden, who commented that he was willing to intervene against the witch trials of Bamberg.

In Bamberg, the assisting Bishop and theologian , who was a leading figure of the witch trials, died this year.  Support among the population began to fade as people increasingly realized that everybody was at risk of ending up on the pyre.  Peasants refused to supply wood for the burnings.   Under pressure, the Prince-Bishop stopped the Witch Commission from making new arrests.   This did not mean that the witch trials ended, however, since those already arrested were still kept in prison.

In July 1631, the Emperor had Anton Winter, known for his opposition to witch hunts, appointed to become the new head of the Prince-Bishop's Witch Commission in Bamberg.   When Anton Winter arrived in Bamberg, the Prince-Bishop fled the city. The bishop fled to Austria.  The Witch Commission under Anton Winter released all the prisoners of the witch prison.  They ended for good when the Protestant Swedish troops approached Bamberg in 1632.

Legacy and aftermath

Several smaller witch trials followed until the last one in 1680.  By that time, a total of around 1,000 people had been killed in the Prince-Bishopric of Bamberg.  In contemporary Germany, the gigantic, parallel mass witch trials of Würzburg and Bamberg were seen as role models by other states and cities interested in investigating witchcraft, notably Wertheim and Mergentheim.

References

Sources
 Hugh Trevor-Roper: The Crisis of the Seventeenth Century. The European Witch-craze of the Sixteenth and Seventeenth Centuries (1967)
 

1626 in law
1631 in law
17th century in Bavaria
1620s in the Holy Roman Empire
1626 in the Holy Roman Empire
Bamberg witch trials